Balázs Csiszér (born 3 March 1999) is a Romanian professional footballer of Hungarian ethnicity who plays as a defender for Liga II side FK Csíkszereda.

International career 
He was member of the Székely Land squad that finished 3rd at 2017 ConIFA European Football Cup and 4th at the 2018 ConIFA World Football Cup respectively.

Career statistics

Club

Honours
FK Miercurea Ciuc
Liga III: 2018–19

Sepsi OSK
Cupa României runner-up: 2019–20

References

External links
 
 
 

1999 births
Living people
People from Miercurea Ciuc
Romanian people of Hungarian descent
Romanian footballers
Romanian sportspeople of Hungarian descent
Association football defenders
Liga I players
Sepsi OSK Sfântu Gheorghe players
Liga II players
FK Csíkszereda Miercurea Ciuc players
Nemzeti Bajnokság II players
Kaposvári Rákóczi FC players
Budafoki LC footballers